The 2020 Texas A&M Aggies baseball team will represent Texas A&M University in the 2020 NCAA Division I baseball season. The Aggies will play their home games at Olsen Field at Blue Bell Park.

Previous season

The Aggies finished 39–23–1 overall, and 16–13–1 in the conference.

Personnel

Roster

Coaching staff

Schedule and results

Schedule Source:
*Rankings are based on the team's current ranking in the D1Baseball poll.

2020 MLB draft

References

Texas A&M
Texas A&M Aggies baseball seasons
Texas A&M Aggies baseball